"#1" is a song recorded by American rapper Nelly. It was released on August 29, 2001 as the lead single from the soundtrack to the 2001 film Training Day. It was also included on Nelly's second studio album Nellyville (2002). The  song was most known for igniting the feud between Nelly and KRS-One, for which KRS-One perceived it as a diss for being too similar to "I'm Still #1" by his group, Boogie Down Productions.

Music video
The music video for the song features Joe Perry of Aerosmith on guitar. The plot of the video closely follows Training Day  with Nelly playing a dual role as both Ethan Hawke and Denzel Washington's characters of a rookie cop and a corrupt veteran cop.

Remix
The official remix features the group Clipse and Postaboy, and the song is on Nelly's remix album, Da Derrty Versions: The Reinvention.

Track listing
US Promo
1 #1 [Radio Version]  3:19	
2 #1 [Instrumental] 4:08 	
3 #1 [Instrumental With #1 Chorus] 4:07

US  Vinyl, 12", Promo
A1 #1 [Album Version] 4:23  	
A2 #1 [Instrumental] 4:08 	
B1 #1 [Instrumental With #1 Chorus] 4:07 	
B2 #1 [Radio Version] 3:19

Charts

References

Nelly songs
2001 songs
2001 singles
Songs written for films
Songs written by Nelly
Universal Records singles